The Last Hurrah of the Golden Horde is the first collection of science fiction stories by author Norman Spinrad. It was originally published by Nelson Doubleday in August 1970 with a Science Fiction Book Club edition and by Avon Books the following month. The collection placed eighth in the Locus Poll for best sf anthology or collection of the year.

Contents
 "Carcinoma Angels" (Dangerous Visions, 1967)
 "The Age of Invention" (F&SF 1966)
 "Outward Bound" (Analog 1964)
 "A Child of Mind" (Amazing 1965)
 "The Equalizer" (Analog 1964)
 "The Last of the Romany" (Analog 1963)
 "Technicality" (Analog 1966)
 "The Rules of the Road" (Galaxy 1964)
 "Dead End" (Galaxy 1969)
 "A Night in Elf Hill" (The Farthest Reaches 1968)
 "Deathwatch" (Playboy 1965)
 "The Ersatz Ego" (Amazing 1964)
 "Neutral Ground" (F&SF 1966)
 "Once More, with Feeling" (Knight 1969)
 "It’s a Bird! It’s a Plane!" (Gent 1967)
 "Subjectivity" (Analog 1964)
 "The Entropic Gang Bang Caper" (New Worlds 1969)
 "The Last Hurrah of the Golden Horde" (New Worlds'' 1969)

"The Ersatz Ego" was originally published as "Your Name Shall Be . . . Darkness."

Reception
Reviewing the collection in Galaxy, Algis Budrys noted that "you become struck by Spinrad's breadth of awareness and by his ability to write a number of different styles well," but that "[Spinrad] never rises above the level of simple, straightforward competence." Budrys concluded that "alarmingly, it's taking Spinrad a very long time to stop synthesizing and start speaking with his own voice."

References

Science fiction short story collections
1970 short story collections
Doubleday (publisher) books
American short story collections